Zari (Pashto/) is a district in Balkh province, Afghanistan. It was created in 2005 from part of Kishindih district.

District profile:
 104 villages
 Schools: 14 primary, 4 secondary, 4 high schools
 Health: 2 basic, 1 comprehensive, 33 posts

History
On 1 May 2020, the Taliban attacked Zari District overnight, killing 13 members of the Afghan security forces and injuring 17 others.

References

External links
 Map of Settlements IMMAP, 2011.

Districts of Balkh Province